The Earth Liberation Prisoners Support Network (ELPSN), also known as Spirit of Freedom, is a network to provide information on people imprisoned for direct action relating to campaigns on environmental and other issues. It includes earth liberationists, animal liberationists, those fighting on anti-war, anti-nuclear and peace issues, indigenous struggles, anti-fascism, land rights, ploughshares and more.

History
The network was set up in the UK in 1993 after the growth of the UK Earth First! and Earth Liberation Front (ELF) groups. At that time there was a sharp rise in the number of actions relating to the environment and a corresponding rise in the number of arrests. The network was initially called the (H)ELP Support Group. The name was chosen to be non-sectarian and neither linked to the ELF or Earth First!. The name changed in 1994 when Noel Molland of Green Anarchist magazine took over the group. In 1995 Molland was arrested and convicted for Conspiracy to Incite Criminal Damage in the GANDALF trial. 

Since that time the network has spread internationally. It provides regular news on current prisoners and contact details of their support networks. It currently features a variety of prisoners, from various anonymous leaderless resistance movements and established groups such as the ELF (including the Green Scare prisoners), Animal Liberation Front, MOVE, SHAC 7, Antifa, Lecce Five and the SNGP campaigners.

See also
Earth Liberation Front Press Office
Vegan Prisoners Support Group (VPSG)
Animal Liberation Front Supporters Group (ALFSG)

Further reading
Leslie Pickering. Earth Liberation Front: 1997-2002, Arissa Media Group, 2006. .
Best, Steven and Nocella, Anthony J. Igniting A Revolution: Voices in Defense of the Earth, AK Press, 2006. 
Rosebraugh, Craig. Burning Rage of a Dying Planet: Speaking for the Earth Liberation Front Lantern Books, 2004.

References

External links
North American Earth Liberation Prisoners Support Network (NAELPSN)
Vegan Prisoners Support Group (VPSG)

Earth Liberation Front
Prison-related organizations
Prisoner support